Lighty is a surname. Notable people with this surname include:

 Chris Lighty (1968–2012), American music industry executive
 Darren Lighty (born 1969), American hip-hop and R&B record producer and songwriter
 David Lighty (born 1988) American professional basketball player
 JoAnn Slama Lighty, American chemical engineer
 Scott Lighty (born 1978), American kickboxer and mixed martial artist